Daniel Bedford Moore (June 12, 1838 – July 2, 1914) served in the Union Army during the American Civil War. He received the Medal of Honor.

Moore was born on June 12, 1838, in Mifflin, Wisconsin. His older brother is said to have been the first white child born in Wisconsin.

He joined the 11th Wisconsin Volunteer Infantry Regiment in September 1861, and mustered out with the regiment in September 1865. In 1865, he saved the life of Lieutenant Angus McDonald at the Battle of Fort Blakeley after the lieutenant was shot and bayoneted while taking the fort.

Moore died on July 2, 1914, and was buried at Graceland Cemetery in Mineral Point, Wisconsin.

Medal of Honor citation
His award citation reads:

For extraordinary heroism on 9 April 1865, while serving with Company E, 11th Wisconsin Infantry, in action at Fort Blakely, Alabama. At the risk of his own life Corporal Moore saved the life of an officer who had been shot down and overpowered by superior numbers.

See also

List of Medal of Honor recipients
List of American Civil War Medal of Honor recipients: M–P

References

1838 births
1914 deaths
People from Iowa County, Wisconsin
Military personnel from Wisconsin
Union Army soldiers
United States Army Medal of Honor recipients
American Civil War recipients of the Medal of Honor